Kurniawan Dwi Yulianto (born 13 July 1976) is a former professional football from Indonesia. Normally playing as a striker, Kurniawan has the fourth most caps and goals for the Indonesia national football team with 33 goals in 59 appearances. His nickname is "Kurus" (literally meaning "skinny") because he has a slender figure. He is currently the assistant coach of Serie B side Como 1907, owned by Indonesian tobacco giant Djarum.

Playing career

Primavera years
Kurniawan became a household name in Indonesia when he went on a scoring spree for the Indonesian youth team that went to Italy in 1993 to train at Serie A club U.C. Sampdoria and play in the Campionato Nazionale Primavera, the league for youth teams of Serie A and Serie B clubs. The Indonesian football association PSSI sent the team abroad for two years to prepare for the 1994 AFC Youth Championship in Jakarta and the qualifying round for the 1996 Summer Olympics. Kurniawan was so prolific that Sampdoria's coach at that time, Sven-Göran Eriksson, included the 18-year old in the team that toured Asia in 1994, along with superstars Roberto Mancini and Attilio Lombardo who just won the 1993-94 Copa Italia title.

FC Luzern
Kurniawan's performance in the Primavera league and with Sampdoria in exhibition matches caught the attention of other European clubs, including Swiss top-tier club FC Luzern that signed him on loan for the 1994-95 season. Kurniawan scored three goals in his 12 appearances for the Lucerne-based club, a respectable result for any teenager with no previous professional career. Kurniawan is the first and only Indonesian national who has scored in a top-flight European league. He was also the only Indonesian who competed and scored in the UEFA Intertoto Cup, which was abolished in 2008. Despite such achievements, young Kurniawan suffered homesickness, culture shock, and injuries in Switzerland.

Sampdoria in 1995 called him back from the loan spell to prepare him for the 1995-96 season of Serie A but Kurniawan chose to return to Indonesia.

Indonesian clubs
Kurniawan played for 12 teams in Indonesia after his 1995 return, winning the national title with PSM Makassar in 2000 and Persebaya Surabaya in 2004. He scored more than 170 goals for those teams combined. That said, his re-entry to Indonesia was not smooth as defenders brutally targeted the popular striker and the media hounded him as a celebrity. The rough transition during his early 20s led him to intentions of quitting football and a drug scandal that made PSSI suspended him from the national team. Criticism was rife against Kurniawan for his inability to match the quality he showed in Europe. He overcame the challenges and became more stable when he joined PSM in 1999 and won his first team trophy in 2000. He came second on the top scorer list that year below his perennial rival Bambang Pamungkas.

Sarawak FA
Despite his popularity coming from his achievements in Europe and Indonesia, he was most prolific when he played in Malaysia for Sarawak FA in 2005-06 with 29 goals in 31 appearances. When he joined, Sarawak was playing in the Malaysian Premier League, the second-tier of Malaysian football. His goals helped the club to win promotion and compete in the 2006 Malaysian Super League.

National team
Outside his dark years in the late 1990s, Kurniawan has always been the top choice for the youth and senior Indonesian national football teams from 1993 to 2005. With 33 goals in 59 appearances for the senior team, he has collected more caps and goals than any other Indonesian, except Bambang Pamungkas who also played in Malaysia when Kurniawan was there. His first three goals were scored against Cambodia in a 10-0 rout in the 1995 Southeast Asian Games in Thailand.

Career statistics

International

International goals

|}

Coaching career
After Kurniawan retired as a player in late 2013, he chose to become a coach at the new Chelsea Soccer School Indonesia, which is supported by English Premier League club Chelsea F.C. despite approaches from Indonesian clubs. One reason was the position did not require him to stay in Indonesia for long stretches as he wanted to spend more time in Malaysia, where his Malaysian wife opens a restaurant business. The pressure of training an Indonesian professional team throughout most of the year would take him away for too long.

After approaches by PSSI and national team coaches, Kurniawan agreed to be a part-time assistant coach for Indonesian youth teams, including the U-23 team that won silver at the 2019 Southeast Asian Games in the Philippines.

Sabah FC
Newly promoted Malaysia Super League club Sabah FC became the first club that hired Kurniawan as a head coach in December 2019. The decision followed the inability of the previous coach Jelius Ating to lead a top-tier team due to his lack of AFC Pro coaching license, which Kurniawan holds.

Kurniawan's first season at Sabah reaped mixed reviews from club decision-makers with some applauding the first-time head coach for keeping the team out of relegation while some criticizing him for only winning two out of 11 matches played in the shortened 2020 Malaysia Super League season amid the COVID-19 pandemic. The latter group managed to push Kurniawan out in November 2020. However, a change of management leadership at the club led to a January 2021 rehiring of Kurniawan who was about to join Malaysia Premier League club Kuching City F.C. as an assistant coach. On 28 August 2021, Sabah lost 4–0 against UiTM FC. Next days, Sabah announced that they had sacked Kurniawan.

Managerial statistics

Personal life
Kurniawan mostly resides in Kuching, Sarawak, Malaysia where his second wife opens a restaurant business that has several outlets. Kurniawan met her when he was playing for Sarawak FA in 2005, two years after his divorce from his first wife.

Honours
PSM Makassar
 Liga Indonesia Premier Division: 1999–2000

Persebaya Surabaya
 Liga Indonesia Premier Division: 2004

Persija Jakarta
 Copa Indonesia runner-up: 2005

Persisam Putra Samarida
 Liga Indonesia Premier Division: 2008–09

Persela Lamongan
 Piala Gubernur Jatim: 2009

Indonesia national team
 Indonesian Independence Cup: Champions (1): 2000
 AFF Championship: Runners-up (2) : 2000, 2004
 Southeast Asian Games: Silver Medal (1): 1997

Individual
Liga Indonesia Premier Division top scorers: 1997–98

References

External links

1976 births
Living people
Indonesian footballers
2000 AFC Asian Cup players
Expatriate footballers in Malaysia
Indonesian expatriate sportspeople in Malaysia
FC Luzern players
Sarawak FA players
Indonesian expatriate footballers
Indonesia international footballers
Pelita Jaya FC players
PSM Makassar players
PSPS Pekanbaru players
Persebaya Surabaya players
Persija Jakarta players
PSS Sleman players
Persitara Jakarta Utara players
Persisam Putra Samarinda players
Persela Lamongan players
PSMS Medan players
Pro Duta FC players
Liga 1 (Indonesia) players
Sportspeople from Central Java
People from Magelang Regency
Javanese people
Association football forwards
Sabah F.C. (Malaysia) managers